Joe Cocozzo  (born August 7, 1970) is a former American football player.  He played professional football as an offensive guard in the National Football League (NFL) for the San Diego Chargers from 1993 to 1997. He also played college football as an offensive guard at the University of Michigan from 1989 to 1992. He was selected as a first-team All-American in 1992.

Early years
Cocozzo was born in Mechanicville, New York, in 1970. He attended Mechanicville High School. He was a star football player for the Mechanicville Red Raiders. His high school honored him at a 2013 ceremony in which his jersey (#77) was put on permanent display.

University of Michigan
Cocozzo enrolled at the University of Michigan in 1988 and played college football for the Michigan Wolverines football teams as an offensive tackle in 1989 and as an offensive guard from 1990 to 1992.  He started 32 games at right guard -- eight in 1990, 12 in 1991, and 12 in 1992.  Cocozzo played for the undefeated 1992 Michigan team that compiled a 9–0–3 record, won the Big Ten Conference championship, and defeated Washington in the 1993 Rose Bowl. At the end of the 1992 season, he was selected as a first-team All-Big Ten player and a first-team All-American. He also played in the 1993 Senior Bowl.

Professional football

Cocozzo was selected by the San Diego Chargers in the third round (64th overall pick) of the 1993 NFL Draft. In July 1993, he signed a three-year contract with the Chargers. He played five seasons for the Chargers from 1993 to 1997.  He appeared in 77 NFL games, including 48 games as a starter. He started 13 regular season games at left guard for the 1994 San Diego Chargers that won the AFC Championship Game, but lost Super Bowl XXIX to the San Francisco 49ers.

He signed with the Washington Redskins as a free agent in June 1998.  He injured his elbow during training camp and was cut with an injury settlement. After rehabilitating for a year, he went to training camp with the New Orleans Saints in 1999.  He broke ribs on the first day of training camp when he was hit by a running back. He announced his official retirement before the 2000 season.

Later years
Cocozzo retired from football after suffering injuries, ultimately undergoing three operations on his left shoulder.  When his playing career was over, he returned to Stillwater and purchased 350 acres adjacent to the Saratoga Battlefield. He later married Amanda Marshall. He and his wife have two sons, Anthony and James.

References

1970 births
Living people
American football offensive guards
Michigan Wolverines football players
San Diego Chargers players
People from Mechanicville, New York
Players of American football from New York (state)